Sir Simon Michael Schama  (born 13 February 1945) is an English historian specialising in art history, Dutch history, Jewish history, and French history. He is a University Professor of History and Art History at Columbia University.

He first came to public attention with his history of the French Revolution titled Citizens, published in 1989. In the United Kingdom, he is perhaps best known for writing and hosting the 15-part BBC television documentary series A History of Britain broadcast between 2000 and 2002. Schama was knighted in the 2018 Queen's Birthday Honours List.

Early life and education
Schama was born on 13 February 1945 in Marylebone, London. His mother, Gertie (née Steinberg), was from an Ashkenazi Lithuanian Jewish family (from Kaunas, present-day Lithuania), and his father, Arthur Schama, was of Sephardi Jewish background (from Smyrna, present-day İzmir in Turkey), later moving through Moldova and Romania.

In the mid-1940s, the family moved to Southend-on-Sea in Essex before moving back to London. In 1956, Schama won a scholarship to the private Haberdashers' Aske's Boys' School in Cricklewood (from 1961 Elstree, Hertfordshire). He then studied history at Christ's College, Cambridge, where he was taught by John H. Plumb. He graduated from the University of Cambridge with a Starred First in 1966.

Career
Schama worked for short periods as a lecturer in history at Cambridge, where he was a fellow and director of studies in history at Christ's College. He then taught for some time at Oxford, where he was made a fellow of Brasenose College in 1976, specialising in the French Revolution. He also worked at the School for Advanced Studies in the Social Sciences (EHESS) in Paris.

At this time, Schama wrote his first book, Patriots and Liberators, which won the Wolfson History Prize. The book was originally intended as a study of the French Revolution, but as published in 1977, it focused on the effect of the Patriottentijd revolution of the 1780s in the Netherlands, and its aftermath.

His second book, Two Rothschilds and the Land of Israel (1978), is a study of the Zionist aims of Edmond and James Rothschild.

In the United States
In 1980, Schama took up a chair at Harvard University. His next book, The Embarrassment of Riches (1987), again focused on Dutch history. Schama interpreted the ambivalences that informed the Dutch Golden Age of the 17th century, held in balance between the conflicting imperatives, to live richly and with power, or to live a godly life. The iconographic evidence that Schama draws upon, in 317 illustrations, of emblems and propaganda that defined Dutch character, prefigured his expansion in the 1990s as a commentator on art and visual culture.
 
Citizens (1989), written at speed to a publisher's commission, saw the publication of his long-awaited study of the French Revolution, and won the 1990 NCR Book Award. Its view that the violence of the Terror was inherent from the start of the Revolution, however, has received serious negative criticism.

Schama appeared as an on-screen expert in Michael Wood's 1989 PBS series Art of the Western World as a presenting art historian, commenting on paintings by Diego Velázquez, Rembrandt, and Johannes Vermeer.

In 1991, he published Dead Certainties (Unwarranted Speculations), a relatively slender work of unusual structure and point-of-view in that it looked at two widely reported deaths a hundred years apart, that of British Army General James Wolfe in 1759 – and the famous 1770 painting depicting the event by Benjamin West – and that of George Parkman, murdered uncle of the better known 19th-century American historian Francis Parkman.

Schama mooted some possible (invented) connections between the two cases, exploring the historian's inability "ever to reconstruct a dead world in its completeness however thorough or revealing the documentation", and speculatively bridging "the teasing gap separating a lived event and its subsequent narration." Not all readers absorbed the nuance of the title: it received a very mixed critical and academic reception. Traditional historians in particular denounced Schama's integration of fact and conjecture to produce a seamless narrative, but later assessments took a more relaxed view of the experiment.

It was an approach soon taken up by such historical writers as Peter Ackroyd, David Taylor, and Richard Holmes.

Sales in hardback exceeded those of Schama's earlier works.

Schama's next book, Landscape and Memory (1995), focused on the relationship between physical environment and folk memory, separating the components of landscape as wood, water and rock, enmeshed in the cultural consciousness of collective "memory" embodied in myths, which Schama finds to be expressed outwardly in ceremony and text. More personal and idiosyncratic than Dead Certainties, this book was more traditionally structured and better-defined in its approach. Despite mixed reviews, the book was a commercial success and won numerous prizes.

Plaudits came from the art world rather than from traditional academia. Schama became art critic for The New Yorker in 1995. He held the position for three years, dovetailing his regular column with professorial duties at Columbia University; a selection of his essays on art for the magazine, chosen by Schama himself, was published in 2005 under the title Hang Ups. During this time, Schama also produced a lavishly illustrated Rembrandt's Eyes, another critical and commercial success. Despite the book's title, it contrasts the biographies of Rembrandt van Rijn and Peter Paul Rubens.

BBC
In 1995, Schama wrote and presented a series called Landscape and Memory to accompany his book of the same name.
 
Schama returned to the UK in 2000, having been commissioned by the BBC to produce a series of television documentary programmes on British history as part of their Millennium celebrations, under the title A History of Britain. Schama wrote and presented the episodes himself, in a friendly and often jocular style with his highly characteristic delivery, and was rewarded with excellent reviews and unexpectedly high ratings. There has been, however, some irritation and criticism expressed by a group of historians about Schama's condensed recounting of the British Isles' history on this occasion, particularly by those specialising in the pre-Anglo-Saxon history of Insular Celtic civilisation. Three series were made, totalling 15 episodes, covering the complete span of British history up until 1965; it went on to become one of the BBC's best-selling documentary series on DVD. Schama also wrote a trilogy of tie-in books for the show, which took the story up to the year 2000; there is some debate as to whether the books are the tie-in product for the TV series, or the other way around. The series also had some popularity in the United States when it was first shown on the History Channel.
 
In 2001, Schama received a CBE. In 2003, he signed a new contract with the BBC and HarperCollins to produce three new books and two accompanying TV series. Worth £3 million (around US$5.3m), it represents the biggest advance deal ever for a TV historian. The first result of the deal was a book and TV show entitled Rough Crossings: Britain, the Slaves and the American Revolution, dealing in particular with the proclamation issued during the Revolutionary War by Lord Dunmore offering slaves from rebel plantations freedom in return for service to the crown.

In 2006, the BBC broadcast a new TV series, Simon Schama's Power of Art, which, with an accompanying book, was presented and written by Schama. It marks a return to art history for him, treating eight artists through eight key works: Caravaggio's David with the Head of Goliath, Bernini's Ecstasy of St Theresa, Rembrandt's Conspiracy of Claudius Civilis, Jacques-Louis David's The Death of Marat, J. M. W. Turner's The Slave Ship, Vincent van Gogh's Wheat Field with Crows, Picasso's Guernica and Mark Rothko's Seagram murals. It was also shown on PBS in the United States.
 

In October 2008, on the eve of the presidential election won by Barack Obama, the BBC broadcast a four-part television series called The American Future: A History presented and written by Schama. In March 2009, Schama presented a BBC Radio 4 show entitled Baseball and Me, both exploring the history of the game and describing his own personal support of the Boston Red Sox.

In 2010, Schama presented a series of ten talks for the BBC Radio 4 series A Point of View:
 Why We Like Tough Guys in Politics: When times are hard people seem to prefer tough leaders.
 Singing in the Rain: Schama looks forward to spring with personal reflections on the changing seasons.
 At the Heart of the Matter: The politics surrounding President Barack Obama's healthcare reforms.
 The Gift of the Gab: The history of political rhetoric and the power during election campaigns of televised debates.
 Behold, Newstralia!: Celebrates the distinctive history and culture of New Zealand and regrets any renewed talk of joining forces with Australia.
 A Welcome Slice of American Pie: Reflection on the quality of American food and eating habits.
 The Drama of Politics: The timeless drama of British politics.
 When Money is Just an Illusion: Reflection on the meaning of money as represented by coins and notes and in art.
 Hearts of Oak: Reflection on the significance of one of the sights that will greet new MPs in the chamber of the House of Commons – the panelling made of solid oak.
 Britain's New Politics: Reflection on the 2010 United Kingdom general election, favourably comparing the British system for a swift handover of power to the cumbersome American one.
 
In 2011 the BBC commissioned Simon Schama to write and present a five-part series called A History of the Jews for BBC Two for transmission in 2012, The title became The Story of the Jews and broadcast was delayed until September 2013. Writing in The Observer, Andrew Anthony called it "an astonishing achievement, a TV landmark."

In 2018, Simon Schama wrote and presented five of the nine episodes of Civilisations, a reboot of the 1969 series by Kenneth Clark.

Personal life
Schama is Jewish. He is married to Virginia Papaioannou, a geneticist from California; they have two children, Chloe and Gabriel. As of 2014, Schama resides in Briarcliff Manor, New York. He is a Tottenham Hotspur supporter.

Politics
In 2010, Schama was a financial donor to Oona King's unsuccessful campaign to become Mayor of London.

In August 2014, Schama was one of 200 public figures who were signatories to a letter to The Guardian expressing their hope that Scotland would vote to remain part of the United Kingdom in September's referendum on that issue.

In November 2017, Schama joined Simon Sebag Montefiore and Howard Jacobson in writing a letter to The Times about their concern over antisemitism in the Labour Party under Jeremy Corbyn's leadership, with particular reference to a growth in Anti-Zionism and its purported "antisemitic characteristics". Schama and Sebag Montefiore have both written historical works about Israel, while Jacobson has written regularly about Israel and the UK Jewish community in his newspaper columns. Schama made a further criticism of the party in July 2019, when he joined other leading Jewish figures in saying, in a letter to The Guardian, that the crisis was "a taint of international and historic shame" and that trust in the party was "fractured beyond repair".

Israel
Schama was critical of British novelist John Berger's support for the Palestinian call for an academic boycott of Israel. Writing in The Guardian in a 2006 article co-authored with Anthony Julius, Schama compared the open letter written by Berger and signed by 92 other leading artists to Nazi Germany, saying: "This is not the first boycott call directed at Jews. On 1 April 1933, only weeks after he came to power, Hitler ordered a boycott of Jewish shops, banks, offices and department stores." 

In 2006 on the BBC, Schama debated with Vivienne Westwood the morality of Israel's actions in the Israel-Lebanon War. He described Israel's bombing of Lebanese city centres as unhelpful to Israel's attempt to "get rid of" Hezbollah. He said: "Of course the spectacle and suffering makes us grieve. Who wouldn't grieve? But it's not enough to do that. We've got to understand. You've even got to understand Israel's point of view."

United States
Schama was a supporter of President Barack Obama and a critic of George W. Bush. He appeared on the BBC's coverage of the 2008 US presidential election, clashing with John Bolton.

Reception and appraisal
Niall Ferguson praised Schama, "Amongst [historians] currently writing, Simon Schama stands out as the Dickens of modern historiography: bewilderingly erudite and prolific, passionate in his enthusiasms and armed with the complete contents of the thesaurus."

Prizes and other honours
 1977: Wolfson History Prize, for Patriots and Liberators
 1977: Leo Gershoy Award, for Patriots and Liberators
 1987: New York Times Best Books of the Year, for The Embarrassment of Riches
 1989: New York Times Best Books of the Year, for Citizens: A Chronicle of the French Revolution
 1989: Yorkshire Post Book Award, for Citizens: A Chronicle of the French Revolution
 1990: NCR Book Award, for Citizens: A Chronicle of the French Revolution
 1992: American Academy of Arts and Letters Award for Literature
 1995: Elected to Honorary Fellowship, Christ's College, Cambridge
 1996: Lionel Trilling Book Award, for Landscape and Memory
 1996: National Magazine Awards, for critical essays in The New Yorker
 1996: WH Smith Literary Award, for Landscape and Memory
 2001: St. Louis Literary Award from the Saint Louis University Library Associates
 2001: Broadcasting Press Guild Writer's Award, for A History of Britain
 2001: Nominated for BAFTA Huw Wheldon Award for Specialised Programme or Series (Arts, History, Religion and Science), for A History of Britain
 2002: Nominated for BAFTA Richard Dimbleby Award for the Best Presenter (Factual, Features and News), for A History of Britain
 2003: Nominated for Outstanding Individual Achievement in a Craft: Writing Emmy Award for The Two Winstons, an episode of A History of Britain
 2006: National Book Critics Circle Award for Non-fiction winner, for Rough Crossings
 2006: Hessell-Tiltman Prize Shortlist, for Rough Crossings
 2007: International Emmy Award, for Bernini, an episode of Simon Schama's Power of Art
 2007: Nominated for BAFTA Huw Wheldon Award for Specialised Factual Programme or Series, for Simon Schama's Power of Art
 2008: The Daily Telegraphs 110 Best Books: The Perfect Library, for Citizens: A Chronicle of the French Revolution
 2011: Kenyon Review Award for Literary Achievement 
 2015: Corresponding Fellow of the British Academy
 2015: Feltrinelli Prize for History
 2017: Fellow of the Royal Society of Literature
 2018: Knight Bachelor, for services to history

Honours

Commonwealth honours
 Commonwealth honours

Scholastic
 University degrees

 Chancellor, visitor, governor, rector and fellowships

Honorary degrees

Memberships and Fellowships

Awards

Bibliography
Books
 Patriots and Liberators: Revolution in the Netherlands 1780–1813 (1977)
 Two Rothschilds and the Land of Israel (1978)
 The Embarrassment of Riches: An Interpretation of Dutch Culture in the Golden Age (1987)
 Citizens: A Chronicle of the French Revolution (1989)
 Dead Certainties: Unwarranted Speculations (1991)
 Landscape and Memory (1995)
 Rembrandt's Eyes (1999)
 A History of Britain Vol. I (2000)
 A History of Britain Vol. II (2001)
 A History of Britain Vol. III (2002)
 Hang Ups: Essays on Art (2004)
 Rough Crossings (2005)
 Simon Schama's Power of Art (2006)
 The American Future: A History (2009)
 Scribble, Scribble, Scribble: Writing on Politics, Ice Cream, Churchill and My Mother (2011)
 The Story of the Jews, Volume I: Finding the Words, 1000 BCE–1492 CE (2013, Bodley Head)
 The Face of Britain: The Nation through Its Portraits (2015)
 Belonging: The Story of the Jews 1492–1900, Volume II of the trilogy (2017, Bodley Head)

Television documentaries
 Landscape and Memory (1995), in five parts
 Rembrandt: The Public Eye and the Private Gaze (1995)
 A History of Britain by Simon Schama – BBC (2000), in 15 parts
 Murder at Harvard – PBS (2003)
 Rough Crossings – BBC (2005)
 Simon Schama's Power of Art – BBC (2006), in eight parts
 The American Future: A History – BBC (2008), in four parts
 Simon Schama's John Donne – BBC (2009)
 Simon Schama's Obama's America – BBC (2009)
 Simon Schama's Shakespeare – BBC (2012)
 The Story of the Jews – BBC (2013), in five parts
 Schama on Rembrandt: Masterpieces of the Late Years – BBC (2014)
 The Face of Britain by Simon Schama – BBC (2015), in five parts
 Civilisations – BBC (2018), five of nine parts
 The Romantics and Us with Simon Schama – BBC (2020)
 Simon Schama's History of Now - BBC (2022)

References

External links

 Columbia Art History faculty page
 
Simon Schama | Culture | The Guardian
Simon Schama | The Guardian
Simon Schama | New Statesman
Simon Schama on The Spectator
 

1945 births
Living people
20th-century English historians
21st-century English historians
21st-century English writers
Alumni of Christ's College, Cambridge
British expatriate academics in the United States
Columbia University faculty
Commanders of the Order of the British Empire
Corresponding Fellows of the British Academy
English art historians
English expatriates in the United States
English Jews
English people of Lithuanian-Jewish descent
English people of Romanian-Jewish descent
English people of Turkish-Jewish descent
English television presenters
Fellows of Brasenose College, Oxford
Fellows of Christ's College, Cambridge
Fellows of the Royal Society of Literature
Harvard University faculty
Historians of the Dutch Republic
Historians of the French Revolution
Historians of the United Kingdom
Jewish historians
Knights Bachelor
People educated at Haberdashers' Boys' School
People from Briarcliff Manor, New York
People from Marylebone
People from Southend-on-Sea
Rembrandt scholars
Scholars of Dutch art